Guno Berenstein (born December 18, 1967 in Nickerie, Suriname) is a Dutch judoka who competed at the 1988 Summer Olympics in the men's extra-lightweight division.

References

1967 births
Living people
Dutch male judoka
Olympic judoka of the Netherlands
Judoka at the 1988 Summer Olympics
Surinamese emigrants to the Netherlands
20th-century Dutch people